The Jonathan C. and Eliza K. Royle House, at 635 East 100 South in Salt Lake City, Utah, is an Italianate style house that was built in 1875.  It was listed on the National Register of Historic Places in 1983.

It is significant both as "one of the finest examples of the Italianate style in Salt Lake City" and as the home of prominent citizens Jonathan C. and Eliza K. Royle. Jonathan Royle was a mining attorney, while his wife Eliza was president of the city's Ladies' Literary Club; both were otherwise active socially. According to the National Register nomination, their residence "was one of the earliest 'high style' houses constructed along First South", which became "a prestigious residential area" in the late nineteenth century.  It is one of only two frame-style Italianate houses known in the city.

References

Houses on the National Register of Historic Places in Utah
Italianate architecture in Utah
Houses completed in 1875
Houses in Salt Lake City
National Register of Historic Places in Salt Lake City